Jørgen Ravn, alternatively spelled Jørn Ravn, (3 June 1940 – 4 June 2015) was a Danish football player.

Club career
He played as an amateur for Kjøbenhavns Boldklub (KB) in Denmark, and became topscorer in the 1st Division in 1961 and 1964. He moved abroad to play professionally for Aberdeen in Scotland in 1965, after being signed by Tommy Pearson alongside compatriots Jens Petersen and Leif Mortensen.

One and a half years later he returned to his native country. After a two years penalty for having played as a professional (mandatory in these years' Danish football), he continued to play for KB some years.

International career
He got 10 caps and scored five goals for the Denmark national under-21 football team. He also played once for his country's B-squad.

Personal life and death
Married to Inger, Ravn worked for over 25 years for Tuborg. He died on 4 June 2015, one day after his 75th birthday.

References

External links 
Danish national team profile
Neil Brown profile

1940 births
2015 deaths
Danish men's footballers
Denmark under-21 international footballers
Kjøbenhavns Boldklub players
Aberdeen F.C. players
Danish expatriate men's footballers
Expatriate footballers in Scotland
Scottish Football League players
Association football forwards